The term most commonly refers to:
 Washington Open (golf) – an annual golf tournament held since 1922 at various locations in the state of Washington
 Washington Open (tennis) – a Washington D.C. tennis tournament held each year since 1969

Other uses include:
 Washington Open DanceSport Competition – ballroom dancing competition held in Virginia.
 Washington Open Chess Championship – a chess event held in Virginia from 2000–present.

See also 
 Greater Washington Open

References